Wiss, Janney, Elstner Associates, Inc. (WJE) is an American corporation of architects, engineers, and materials scientists specializing in the investigation, analysis, testing, and design of repairs for historic and contemporary buildings and structures. Founded in 1956, WJE is headquartered in Northbrook, Illinois, and has over 600 professionals in twenty offices across the United States. WJE personnel are specialized in architectural, structural, and civil engineering; materials conservation, chemistry and petrography, and testing and instrumentation.

History

1956–1970: Beginning Years
Jack R. Janney originally established WJE in 1956 as Janney and Associates. Earlier that year, President Dwight D. Eisenhower enacted the Federal-Aid Highway Act of 1956, authorizing the construction of over 40,000 miles of roads for the interstate highway system. Working for the Portland Cement Association (PCA), Janney was recognized for his knowledge of prestressed concrete by the Illinois State Toll Highway Authority and was offered a consulting position for a new construction project utilizing full scale load testing. During this time, Janney established his own firm with fellow engineer and neighbor Jack Wiss. In 1957, the company became Wiss and Janney Associates. In 1961, former PCA colleague Dick Elstner joined the company and it was renamed Wiss, Janney, Elstner Associates, Inc.

Shortly thereafter, the United States National Academy of Sciences retained WJE to conduct full-scale load tests at the site of the 1964 New York World's Fair.

WJE Projects throughout the 1950s and 1960s
 1964 - 1964 New York World's Fair - New York, New York - fullscale load testing
 1970 – Present - Soldier Field - Chicago, Illinois - long-term condition assessment and rehabilitation services

WJE Projects throughout the 1980s
 1981 - Kansas City Hyatt collapse - Kansas City, Missouri  
 1985–Present - Baha'i Temple, ornamental concrete investigation and repair
 1988 - Aon Center (Chicago) - investigation of marble panels and recladding

1991-2000
WJE participated in the reconstruction of the ill-fated TWA Flight 800, which exploded shortly after take off on July 17, 1996. The reconstructed aircraft segment was featured in many television news broadcasts and publications. Additionally, over a period of twelve years, WJE led a multidisciplinary team that assisted the Kennedy Center for the Performing Arts in Washington, D.C. with assessing and addressing issues of deterioration and obsolescence.

WJE Projects throughout the 1990s
 1991-2005 - Kennedy Center for the Performing Arts - Washington, D.C. - investigation and preservation, and rehabilitation design
 1996 - TWA Flight 800 - Long Island, New York - reassembled recovered pieces of the plane to permit unobstructed viewing of the aircraft to assist in the diagnosis of the cause of the crash
 1998 - Cape Hatteras Lighthouse - Buxton, North Carolina - preservation and instrumentation for relocation  
 1998–Present - Wacker Drive - Chicago, Illinois - structural and durability studies for reconstruction
 1999 - Alcatraz Cellhouse - San Francisco, California - stabilization and seismic upgrade

2000-Present
WJE continued to undertake many new assignments, including the investigation of Perry's Victory and International Peace Memorial, restoration services at the New York Public Library, plaza investigation and repair services for the Lyndon Baines Johnson Library and Museum, facade restoration of the American Museum of Natural History, comprehensive planning studies for Aloha Stadium, and a condition assessment and materials evaluation following the I-580 connector collapse at the MacArthur Maze.

In August 2006, the Commonwealth of Massachusetts retained WJE to undertake a comprehensive safety audit of the Central Artery/Tunnel project, also known as the "Big Dig (Boston, Massachusetts)". WJE engineers, architects, and materials scientists completed the stem-to-stern safety audit in ninety days.

In August 2007, the Minnesota Department of Transportation (MnDOT) retained WJE to conduct an investigation following the collapse of the I-35W Bridge to determine the cause of the collapse. WJE was responsible for planning and overseeing the removal and dismantlement of all structural components so the NTSB and other investigators could examine and record conditions at the site.

In August 2011, the National Park Service retained WJE to assess earthquake damage to the Washington Monument following the August 24 earthquake. In September, members of WJE's Difficult Access Team rappelled from the Monument's exterior over the course of several days to visually inspect for damage.

Hurricane Sandy, which hit in October 2012, was a deadly and destructive storm that impacted twenty-four states with particularly severe damage in New Jersey and New York. WJE responded to hundreds of calls from clients seeking assistance for hurricane-related assessment and investigative services.

The Leo Frigo Memorial Bridge, crossing the Fox River in Green Bay, Wisconsin, was temporarily closed when a 400-foot stretch of deck sagged due to significant and sudden settlement of a pier. Shortly after the event in 2013, WJE was retained to investigate the failure and to design a temporary stabilization structure.

Over the past two decades, National Park Service personnel noticed discoloration and streaking at the stainless steel exterior of the iconic Gateway Arch in St. Louis, Missouri. During several phases from 2005 to 2015, WJE investigated and documented the history and conditions of the Gateway Arch. As part of a phased corrosion study to determine the source of distress, a team of WJE staff utilized industrial rope access techniques to access surfaces of the structure not seen up close since the 630-foot monument was completed in 1965.

WJE Projects 2000–Present
 
 2001 - Poplar Street Complex - East St. Louis, Illinois -  Seismic and Redundancy Retrofit Project
 2005 - Hurricane Katrina - New Orleans, Louisiana - Damage Inspection
 2006–2007 - Big Dig (Boston, Massachusetts) - Stem-to-Stern Safety Audit
 2007 - Lyndon Baines Johnson Library and Museum - Austin, Texas - Plaza Investigation and Repair Services
 2007 - Perry's Victory and International Peace Memorial - Put-in-Bay, Ohio - Investigation and Repair of Monument
 2007 - I-35W Bridge - Minneapolis, Minnesota - Collapse Investigation
 2007 - Illinois State Capitol - Springfield, Illinois -  House Chamber, Art Glass laylight Reconstruction
 2007 - Blackstone Hotel - Chicago, Illinois - Exterior Facade Investigation
 2007 - Aloha Stadium - Honolulu, Hawaii - Structural Certification
 2007 - MacArthur Maze - Bay Area, California - Condition Assessment and Materials Evaluation
 2011 - The Washington Monument - Washington, D.C. - Condition Assessment and Repair Recommendation Due to Earthquake
 2012 - Hurricane Sandy - New Jersey and New York - Investigation of Storm Damage Claims
 2013 - Leo Frigo Memorial Bridge - Green Bay, Wisconsin - Failure Investigation and Temporary Stabilization Design
 2015 - Gateway Arch - St. Louis, Missouri - Corrosion Investigation and Historic Structure Report

Firm and Project Awards
Alcatraz Cellhouse - San Francisco, California - California Preservation Foundation: Design Award in the Craftsmanship category, 2005; International Concrete Repair Institute: Award of Excellence in the Repair of Historic Structures category, 2005.
Blackstone Hotel - Chicago, Illinois - Chicago Landmark Award for Preservation Excellence from the Commission of Chicago Landmarks, 2008; Excellence in Masonry (gold award) from the Illinois Indiana Masonry Council, 2008; Design Award (silver medal) from the Association of Licensed Architects, 2008; Project of the Year from Midwest Construction, 2008
Eldridge Street Synagogue - New York, New York - The New York Landmarks Conservancy: Lucy G. Moses Preservation Award, 2008
Hyatt Regency Hotel - Atlanta, Georgia - International Concrete Repair Institute (ICRI): Outstanding Project of the Year: Award of Excellence in the High-Rise category, 2006
Illinois State Capitol - Springfield, Illinois - Executive Director's Award for Pride in Partnership; Richard H. Driehaus Foundation Preservation Award, 2007
Metropolitan Museum of Art - New York, New York - The New York Landmarks Conservancy: Lucy G. Moses Preservation Award, 2005
State Bar of California Building - San Francisco, California - Structural Engineers Association of Northern California (SEAONC) Award of Excellence in the Retrofit/Alteration Category, 2007; Innovative Design in Engineering and Architecture with Structural Steel (IDEAS2) Awards: Presidential Award of Excellence in Structural Engineering, 2008
Harden Wind Engine - Structural Engineers Association of Northern California (SEAONC) Award of Merit in the Historic Preservation Category, 2007
American Museum of Natural History - New York, New York - Preservation League of New York State: Excellence in Historic Preservation Award, 2010,
Baha'i House of Worship - Wilmette, Illinois - The International Concrete Repair Institute: Award of Merit, 2010, 2011
New York Public Library - New York, New York - The New York Landmarks Conservancy: Lucy G. Moses Preservation Award, 2011
Grove Park Inn Resort & Spa - Asheville, North Carolina - Historic Hotels of America: Best 2010 Preservation Success Story, 2010
Sather Gate at the University of California, Berkeley - Berkeley, California - California Preservation Foundation: Design Award, 2010
Savery Hall - University of Washington - Seattle, Washington - MCAA: Tribute to Exemplary Achievements in Masonry Award, 2011
Holy Name Cathedral - Chicago, Illinois - SEAOI: Award of Excellence, 2011
Sherith Israel - San Francisco, California - California Preservation Foundation: Preservation Design Award, 2011
New York Public Library, Stephen A. Schwartzman Building - New York, New York - American Institute of Architects (AIA): AIA Institute Honor Award for Architecture, 2013
Eisenhower Executive Office Building - Washington, D.C. - General Services Administration: Design Award, 2014
National September 11 Memorial and Museum - New York, New York - American Institute of Architects (AIA): Honor Award (Interior Architecture), 2015; Building Design+Construction Building Team Award (Gold), 2015
American Architectural Foundation: Oculus Award for Leadership in Design and Cultural Heritage, 2015
Mount Moriah Cemetery Gatehouse - Philadelphia - Preservation Alliance for Greater Philadelphia Preservation Achievement Grand Jury Award, 2018

References

External links
Official web site

Architecture firms based in Illinois
American companies established in 1956
Engineering consulting firms of the United States
Companies based in Northbrook, Illinois
Consulting firms established in 1956